Virgilijus Sonta was a Lithuanian photographer.

Biography 
Sonta's mother and father were Americans, who came to Lithuania before World War II and stayed there. Virgilijus Sonta was a homosexual, but it took him many years to accept his own nature. He tried to "cure" his attraction to men by taking some medications, getting into hospitals and even fasting.

Shonta's first work was the series “Lithuanian Landscapes”, and already in 1973, together with Romualdas Pozherskis, he opened his first photo exhibition. From a trip to Siberia and the Far East, the photographer brought a series of "Stones of the North". In his "Flight" series, he originally interpreted the myth of Icarus. Shonta filmed a lot of folk artists and artists in various parts of Lithuania. In the early 80s he was attracted by social themes and the photographer created his most emotional series "School is my home" about the everyday life of children with psychological disabilities. When the political situation in the Soviet Union began to change, Shonta filmed rallies for the independence of Lithuania. the photographer constantly added pictures from the Lithuanian coast to his characteristic series “Things and Forms.” Since 1988, Shonta visited the United States four times and took the last series of photographs in his life, “Evening Presentment,” in the deserts of Western America.

Shonta once said:

Exhibitions 
 2013. Road to the own land. Solo. "Rahmaninov court" Gallery. St Petersburg, Russia
 2014. Classics of Lithuanian photography. "Brothers Lumier Center for Photography". Moscow, Russia
 2018. Tbilisi Photography Festival.
 2020. Lithuanian photography retrospective. "National Museum of Taras Shevchenko". Kyiv, Ukraine

Collections 
MO Museum.
San Francisco Museum of Modern Art

Bibliography 
 "Photography: problems of poetry". Librocom. Moscow.

References 

LGBT photographers
Lithuanian photographers

1952 births
1992 deaths